The SCC68070 is a Philips Semiconductors-branded, Motorola 68000-based 16/32-bit processor produced under license.  While marketed externally as a high-performance microcontroller, it has been almost exclusively used combined with the Philips SCC66470 VSC (Video- and Systems Controller) in the Philips CD-i interactive entertainment product line.

Additions to the Motorola 68000 core include:

 Operation from 4 - 17.5 MHz
 Inclusion of a minimal, segmented MMU supporting up to 16 MB of memory
 Built-in DMA controller
 I²C bus controller 
 UART
 16-bit counter/timer unit
 2 match/count/capture registers allowing the implementation of a pulse generator, event counter or reference timer
 Clock generator

Differences from the Motorola 68000 core include these:

 Instruction execution timing is completely different
 Interrupt handling has been simplified
 The SCC68070 has MC68010 style bus-error recovery.  They are not compatible, so exception error processing is different.
 The SCC68070 lacks a dedicated address generation unit (AGU), so operations requiring address calculation run slower due to contention with the shared ALU.  This means that most instructions take more cycles to execute, for some instructions significantly more, than a 68000.
 The MMU is not compatible with the Motorola 68451 or any other "standard" Motorola MMU, so operating system code dealing with memory protection and address translation is not generally portable.  Enabling the MMU also costs a wait state on each memory access.

While the SCC68070 is mostly binary compatible with the Motorola 68000, there is no equivalent chip in the Motorola 680x0 series.  In particular, the SCC68070 is not a follow-on to the Motorola 68060.

Even though the SCC68070 is a 32-bit processor internally, it has a 24-bit address bus, giving it a theoretical 16MB maximum RAM. However, this is not possible, as all of the on-board peripherals are mapped internally.

External links 
xs4all.nl/~ganswijk/chipdir/reg/68070.txt

68k microprocessors

Microcontrollers
Freescale Semiconductor
Philips products